Qijian Xia Tianshan is a wuxia novel by Liang Yusheng first published as a serial between 15 February 1956 and 31 March 1957 in the Hong Kong newspaper Ta Kung Pao. Considered the third part of the Tianshan series of novels by Liang Yusheng, it is closely related to the first two parts, Baifa Monü Zhuan and Saiwai Qixia Zhuan .

Plot 
The prologue serves as a continuation of Yang Yuncong and Nalan Minghui's story in Saiwai Qixia Zhuan, which is set in 17th-century China during the early Qing dynasty. Nalan Minghui has been forced to marry Prince Dodo even though she is in love with Yang Yuncong and has secretly given birth to their daughter. Yang Yuncong shows up on the night before her wedding and seizes their infant daughter from her. After he is mortally wounded in a fight against Prince Dodo's henchmen, he entrusts his daughter to Mulang, a youth who was attempting suicide after being mistakenly accused of betraying his friends. Mulang brings Yang Yuncong's daughter back to Mount Heaven, where Yang Yuncong was trained by Reverend Huiming.

Mulang spends 18 years training under Reverend Huiming's tutelage and becomes a formidable swordsman. He returns to the jianghu (martial artists' community) under  a new name, "Ling Weifeng", and performs several heroic deeds. Yang Yuncong's daughter, Yilan Zhu, has also become a powerful swordswoman, and she swears to kill Prince Dodo to avenge her father. On Mount Wutai, members of the Tiandihui, an anti-Qing secret society, and some Southern Ming rebels attempt to assassinate Prince Dodo, but their plans are interrupted by Yilan Zhu's untimely appearance. During the ensuing chaos, Yilan Zhu unintentionally causes Zhang Huazhao, one of the rebels, to be captured by Qing soldiers. Later, she breaks into Prince Dodo's residence to rescue him.

Meanwhile, Fu Qingzhu and Mao Wanlian discover that the Shunzhi Emperor is still alive and has become a monk on Mount Wutai. The Shunzhi Emperor's son and successor, the Kangxi Emperor, secretly murders his father to safeguard his throne. Meanwhile, Ling Weifeng meets his old crush, Liu Yufang, who had wrongly accused him of betrayal 18 years ago. Even though his appearance has changed, she notices that he bears some resemblance to Mulang despite his refusal to admit that he is indeed Mulang. Ling Weifeng and Liu Yufang travel to Yunnan later and befriend Li Siyong, a descendant of Li Zicheng. They also encounter Fu Qingzhu and Mao Wanlian, as well as others such as Gui Zhongming and Wu Qiongyao, who become their allies. Gui Zhongming falls in love with Mao Wanlian after she helps him recover from past trauma.

Gui Zhongming and Mao Wanlian go to Beijing later to find Yilan Zhu and they meet the scholar Nalan Rongruo. In the meantime, Nalan Minghui recognises Yilan Zhu as her daughter and she pleads with Prince Dodo to spare her daughter's life. After much difficulty, Yilan Zhu and Zhang Huazhao escape from danger and they fall in love. Yilan Zhu avenges her father later by assassinating Prince Dodo, but ends up being captured and imprisoned. Nalan Minghui is unable to save her daughter so she commits suicide in despair. Hamaya, Nalan Minghui's former love rival, shows up with Ling Weifeng in the nick of time and they rescue Yilan Zhu.

Ling Weifeng suddenly experiences a seizure in a duel against Chu Zhaonan, his treacherous senior. Chu Zhaonan turns the tables on Ling Weifeng and captures and imprisons him in an underground labyrinth in Tibet. Ling Weifeng attempts to escape but fails and finds himself on the verge of death. He writes a letter to Liu Yufang, admitting that he is Mulang; Liu Yufang is heartbroken upon reading his letter. Han Zhibang, who has a secret crush on Liu Yufang, bravely sacrifices himself to save Ling Weifeng and dies at the hands of Chu Zhaonan. Fu Qingzhu and the other heroes break into the labyrinth to rescue Ling Weifeng. Yilan Zhu defeats Chu Zhaonan, who then commits suicide.

Ling Weifeng, Zhang Huazhao, Gui Zhongming, Yilan Zhu, Mao Wanlian, Wu Qiongyao, and Hamaya become known as the "Seven Swords of Mount Heaven", with Liu Yufang as their close ally. They leave behind a heroic legacy of upholding justice and helping the poor and oppressed.

Characters

Adaptations

Films 
In 1959, Hong Kong's Emei Film Company produced a film titled Seven Swordsmen Leave Tianshan based on the novel. It starred Cheung Wood-yau, Law Yim-hing, Lam Kau, Hoh Bik-gin, Shek Sau, Yeung Fan and Yeung Yip-wang.

Tsui Hark's 2005 film Seven Swords features seven swordsman, each wielding a special sword, departing from Mount Heaven to save a village under attack by a ruthless warlord. The seven swords are: the Dragon wielded by Chu Zhaonan; the Transience wielded by Yang Yuncong; the Star Chasers wielded by Xin Longzi; the Celestial Beam wielded by Mulang; the Deity wielded by Han Zhibang; the Heaven's Fall wielded by Wu Yuanying; and the Unlearnt wielded by Fu Qingzhu. Except for some characters' names, the story and the seven swords are not related to Qijian Xia Tianshan. Donnie Yen, Leon Lai, Charlie Yeung, Lu Yi and Sun Honglei starred in the leading roles.

Television 
In 2006, Tsui Hark produced Seven Swordsmen, a television series derived from the 2005 film Seven Swords. It starred Vincent Zhao, Wang Xuebing, Ray Lui, Ada Choi, Qiao Zhenyu, Li Xiaoran, Wang Likun and Bryan Leung. The story is based more on Saiwai Qixia Zhuan, the novel preceding Qijian Xia Tianshan, even though it shares the same Chinese title as the latter.

Comics 
In 2006, Chinese artists Guangzu and Niu Tongxue released a manhua series of the same Chinese title as the novel.

Novels by Liang Yusheng
Novels set in the Qing dynasty
Novels set in the 17th century